Lower Mendi Rural LLG is a local-level government (LLG) of Southern Highlands Province, Papua New Guinea.

Wards
01. Endowa
02. Tepe/Eskamb
03. Sumia 1
04. Sumia 2
05. Yore 1
06. Yore 2
07. Tutam
08. Yebi 1
09. Yebi 2
10. Aisaisa
11. Pundia/Limbiali
12. Megi
13. Onne
14. Yaken 1
15. Yebi 3
16. Omai
17. Pororo
18. Mil/Warip
19. Sumia 3
20. Yaria
21. Kiberu
22. Yaken 1
23. Bui-iebi
24. Lumbi/Tutam
25. Una/Kos
26. Pinj

References

Local-level governments of Southern Highlands Province